Haritz Zunzunegui (born 1 May 1975) is a Spanish cross-country skier. He competed at the 1998 Winter Olympics and the 2002 Winter Olympics.

References

External links
 

1975 births
Living people
Spanish male cross-country skiers
Olympic cross-country skiers of Spain
Cross-country skiers at the 1998 Winter Olympics
Cross-country skiers at the 2002 Winter Olympics
People from Tolosa, Spain